The 1991 Jello Tennis Classic was a women's tennis tournament played on indoor hard courts at the Indianapolis Racquet Club in Indianapolis, Indiana in the United States and was part of the Tier IV category of the 1991 WTA Tour. It was the 12th edition of the tournament and ran from November 11 through November 16, 1991. First-seeded Katerina Maleeva won the singles title and earned $27,000 first-prize money.

Finals

Singles
 Katerina Maleeva defeated  Audra Keller 7–6(7–1), 6–2
 It was Maleeva' 1st singles title of the year and the 10th of her career.

Doubles
 Patty Fendick /  Gigi Fernández defeated  Katrina Adams /  Mercedes Paz 6–4, 6–2

References

External links
 ITF tournament edition details
 Tournament draws

Jello Tennis Classic
Virginia Slims of Indianapolis
Jello Tennis Classic
Jello Tennis Classic
Jello Tennis Classic